Ahoy Comics is an American comic book publisher. It was founded in 2018 by publisher Hart Seely, editors Tom Peyer and Stuart Moore, and chief creative officer Frank Cammuso. At its launch, Ahoy sought to distinguish itself from other comics publishers by including additional "backup material" in each periodical issue, such as prose and poetry features.

History 
Ahoy launched in 2018 with limited series The Wrong Earth by Tom Peyer and Jamal Igle, High Heaven by Peyer and Greg Scott, and Captain Ginger by Stuart Moore and June Brigman; and the anthology Edgar Allan Poe's Snifter of Terror. The following year it launched Bronze Age Boogie by Moore and Alberto Ponticelli; Planet of the Nerds by Paul Constant, Alan Robinson, and Randy Elliott; Hashtag: Danger by Peyer and Chris Giarrusso; and the one-shot anthology Steel Cage.

Following DC Comics' decision not to publish the announced limited series Second Coming by Mark Russell and Richard Pace due to creative differences over the controversial subject matter – it features Jesus Christ in the context of a superhero universe – the series was announced for publication by Ahoy.

Comic books

References

External links
Two Years of AHOY Comics at MultiversityComics.com

Comic book publishing companies of the United States
Publishing companies established in 2018
Publishing companies based in New York (state)
2018 establishments in New York (state)